Barry John Maister  (born 6 June 1948) is a former New Zealand field hockey player, who was a member of the national team that won the gold medal at the 1976 Summer Olympics in Montreal. He is also a former member of the International Olympic Committee.

Early life and family
Maister was born in Christchurch on 6 June 1948, and is the younger brother of Selwyn Maister. Barry Maister was educated at Christchurch Boys' High School, and then studied at the University of Canterbury, graduating BSc(Hons) in 1971, before completing a Diploma of Teaching at Christchurch Teachers' College.

In 1970, Maister married Cheryl Chamberlain, and the couple went on to have three children.

Sporting career
During his hockey career he played 85 games for New Zealand as a centre forward, and represented his country at three Olympic Games—in 1968, 1972, and 1976—winning a gold medal with the New Zealand team in 1976. He later coached the New Zealand junior academy team, and served on the executive of the New Zealand Secondary Schools Sports Council.

Maister was an International Olympic Committee member from 2010 until 2018 when, according to protocol, he retired from the role after turning 70. 

In 1991, the New Zealand hockey team that won the men's team gold medal at the 1976 Olympics was inducted into the New Zealand Sports Hall of Fame. In the 2012 New Year Honours, Maister was appointed an Officer of the New Zealand Order of Merit for services to sport. He was promoted to Companion of the New Zealand Order of Merit, for services to sport and the community, in the 2020 Queen's Birthday Honours.

Teaching career
Maister taught at Christchurch Boys' High School for 16 years, including two years as deputy principal. He then worked as principal of Riccarton High School, before moving to St Andrew's College where he was rector.

References

External links
 
 

1948 births
Living people
Field hockey players from Christchurch
People educated at Christchurch Boys' High School
University of Canterbury alumni
New Zealand male field hockey players
Olympic field hockey players of New Zealand
Field hockey players at the 1968 Summer Olympics
Field hockey players at the 1972 Summer Olympics
Field hockey players at the 1976 Summer Olympics
Olympic gold medalists for New Zealand
Medalists at the 1976 Summer Olympics
Olympic medalists in field hockey
New Zealand sports executives and administrators
Companions of the New Zealand Order of Merit
International Olympic Committee members
Heads of schools in New Zealand
New Zealand field hockey coaches